Ink is a 2017 play by James Graham which premiered in London in 2017.

Productions

Almeida Production 
Directed by Rupert Goold, the play began previews at the Almeida Theatre on 17 June 2017, with an official opening night on 27 June. It played a limited run to 5 August. The cast included Bertie Carvel as Rupert Murdoch and Richard Coyle as the editor of The Sun, Larry Lamb. Reviews were generally favorable.

West End 
The production transferred to the West End at the Duke of York's Theatre, again led by Carvel and Coyle, officially opening on 19 September 2017 following previews from 9 September. It concluded its run on 6 January 2018.

Broadway 
The play made its Broadway premiere on 2 April 2019 (previews), officially on 24 April 2019, produced by the Manhattan Theatre Club at the Samuel J. Friedman Theatre. Bertie Carvel played Murdoch and Jonny Lee Miller played Larry Lamb. Direction was by Rupert Goold. The play closed on 7 July 2019.

Overview
The play takes place in London in 1969. Rupert Murdoch buys a struggling newspaper, The Sun, intending to make the paper a must-read news source and hires editor Larry Lamb.

Awards and nominations

Original London production

Original Broadway production

References

External links 
 Internet Broadway Database

2017 plays
West End plays
Plays by James Graham